Ebenezer Place, in Wick, Caithness, Scotland, is credited by the Guinness Book of Records as being the world's shortest street at . The street has only one address: the entrance to No. 1 Bistro, which is part of Mackays Hotel. The hotel has other frontages onto Union Street and River Street, with its main entrance on Union Street.

Ebenezer Place originated in 1883, when 1 Ebenezer Place was constructed; the owner of the building was instructed to display a name on the shortest side of the hotel. It was officially declared a street in 1887.

Ebenezer Place was only recognised by the Guinness Book of Records in 2006, after the owner of the Mackays Hotel building made an entrance into a new bistro.

References 

Wick, Caithness
Streets in Scotland
Squares in Scotland
World record holders